Christopher Lenroy Nanco (born February 15, 1995) is a Canadian professional soccer player who most recently played for Forge FC of the Canadian Premier League.

Early life
He began playing youth soccer with Brampton Youth SC. At age 12, he joined Sigma FC. While with Sigma, he had an opportunity to trial with the Liverpool Academy in England in 2010.

College career
In June 2013, Nanco committed to Syracuse University, where he played for the men's soccer team. He made his debut on August 30 against the Colgate Raiders. He scored his first two goals for Syracuse on September 9, 2013, against the Manhattan Jaspers. As a sophomore, he scored five goals and added two assists, finishing as the team's second leading scorer. During his junior season, he began playing as a central forward, also playing a midfield role at times, transitioning from a primarily winger role in earlier seasons. He finished his junior season with four goals. On September 1, 2016, he had his second career two-goal game, leading Syracuse to a 3–0 victory over Colgate. As a senior, he led the team in scoring with seven goals and at the end of his senior season, he was named an All-ACC First Team All-Star and to the All-South Region third team. Through his time at Syracuse, the team had a perfect 16-0 record in games he scored. He was invited to the MLS Player Combine, ahead of the 2017 MLS SuperDraft.

Club career
From 2014 to 2016, Nanco played in League1 Ontario with Sigma FC, during the college off-seasons. In 2016, he was named to the League1 Ontario All-Star Game roster for the West Division.

In January 2017, Nanco was selected 55th overall in the 2017 MLS SuperDraft by Philadelphia Union. In March 2017, he signed a professional contract with the Union's USL side, Bethlehem Steel. He scored his first professional goal in his professional debut on April 15, 2017, against the Harrisburg City Islanders. After the 2018 season, he departed the club.

In November 2018, Nanco joined Forge FC for the inaugural season of the Canadian Premier League in 2019, being one of the team's first two ever signings. Nanco helped Forge win the CPL championship in their first season. On August 22, 2019, he scored to lead Forge to a 1–0 victory in the first leg of the CONCACAF League Round of 16 over Honduran club Olimpia. In 2020, Nanco missed half of the season with a hamstring injury, as Forge once again won the league title. In February 2021, he re-signed with the club for the 2021 season.

International career
In January 2011, he debuted in the Canadian national program, attending a camp with the Canada U17 team. He won a silver medal with them at the 2011 CONCACAF U-17 Championship, scoring the winning goal in a 2–0 victory over Trinidad and Tobago U17 on February 23, 2011, to qualify Canada for the 2011 FIFA U-17 World Cup, where he also played.

In August 2014, he was named to the Canada U20 for the Dale Farm Milk Cup and was also named to the team for the 2015 CONCACAF U-20 Championship.

Career statistics

Honours

Club
Forge FC
 Canadian Premier League: 2019, 2020, 2022

References

External links 
 
 

1995 births
Living people
Association football forwards
Canadian soccer players
Soccer players from Toronto
Sportspeople from North York
Black Canadian soccer players
Canadian sportspeople of Jamaican descent
Canadian expatriate soccer players
Expatriate soccer players in the United States
Canadian expatriate sportspeople in the United States
Syracuse Orange men's soccer players
Philadelphia Union draft picks
Philadelphia Union II players
Forge FC players
League1 Ontario players
USL Championship players
Canadian Premier League players
Canada men's youth international soccer players
2015 CONCACAF U-20 Championship players
Sigma FC players